Kyung-lim, also spelled Kyung-rim or Kyung-nim, is a Korean unisex given name. Its meaning differs based on the hanja used to write each syllable of the name. There are 54 hanja with the reading "kyung" and nine hanja with the reading "lim" on the South Korean government's official list of hanja which may be registered for use in given names.

People with this name include:
Prince Gyeongnim (1534–1602), Joseon Dynasty official and nobleman
Shin Kyeong-nim (born 1936), South Korean writer
Shin Gyeong-rim (politician) (신경림, born 1954), South Korean politician with the Saenuri Party
Park Kyung-lim (born 1979), South Korean entertainer and comedian

See also
List of Korean given names

References

Korean unisex given names